The 2017 Guangzhou R&F season is the 7th year in Guangzhou R&F's existence and its 7th season in the Chinese football league, also its 6th season in the top flight.

Review
7 November 2016, Guangzhou R&F confirmed that Lu Lin, Huang Zhengyu and Zeng Chao signed a renewed contract with Guangzhou R&F.
25 November 2016, Guangzhou R&F confirmed that Tang Miao signed a renewed contract with Guangzhou R&F until the end of the 2021.
25 January 2017, Guangzhou R&F confirmed that Eran Zahavi signed a renewed contract with Guangzhou R&F until the end of the 2020.
25 January 2017, Guangzhou R&F confirmed that Wang Song and Xiao Zhi signed a renewed contract with Guangzhou R&F.
7 February 2017, Guangzhou R&F confirmed that Chang Feiya signed a renewed contract with Guangzhou R&F until the end of the 2019.
21 February 2017, Guangzhou R&F confirmed that Renatinho signed a renewed contract with Guangzhou R&F until the end of the 2019.

Coaching and medical staff

{|class="wikitable"
|-
!Position
!Staff
|-
|Head coach|| Dragan Stojković
|-
|rowspan="2"|Assistant coaches|| Žarko Đurović
|-
| Dejan Govedarica
|-
|Fitness coach|| Katsuhito Kinoshi
|-
|Goalkeeper coach|| Huang Hongtao
|-
|Team leader|| Huang Jun
|-
|rowspan="2"|Team physicians|| Fan Bihua
|-
| Marco van der Steen
|-
|Physiotherapist|| Raldy van Haastert
|-
|Performance manager|| Bito Wu
|-
|rowspan="3"|Interpreters|| Hong Wenjie
|-
| Weng Zhanhong
|-
| Piao Jun
|-

Squad

Winter

First team

Reserve team

Summer

First team

Reserve team

Transfers

Winter

In

Out

Summer

In

Out

R&F (Hong Kong)

Friendlies

Pre-season

Mid-season

Competitions

Chinese Super League

Table

Results by round

Results summary

League Matches

Chinese FA Cup

Statistics

Appearances and goals

Goalscorers

Assists

Disciplinary record

Notes

References

Chinese football clubs 2017 season
Guangzhou City F.C. seasons